TestingMom.com is an online test prep for parents of gifted education and testing along with skill building, founded in 2010. Testing Mom membership services include expert advice, tele-seminars, practice questions, as well as books and games. The online programs help parents of children pre-K to 8th grade with skill building activities for school success and testing success. The platform also has content for common core testing and state testing.

The site also sponsors educational seminars, where parents learn about the process of getting into private schools or gifted and talented programs. TestingMom.com was founded by Michael McCurdy, NYC Gifted and Talented Parent Expert and by New York Times best-selling author and the Testing Mom, Karen Quinn, whose books Testing For Kindergarten and The Ivy Chronicles led to her moniker of the "Testing Mom."

In 2011, the New York Post used several of Testing Mom's questions as part of a gifted education article.

Tests Covered

As of 2018, TestingMom.com carries the over 45,000 practice questions for tests like the Bracken School Readiness Assessment, Wechsler Preschool and Primary Scale of Intelligence, Kaufman Brief Intelligence Test, Otis–Lennon School Ability OLSAT Test, Raven’s Standard Progressive Matrices, Reynolds Intellectual Assessment Scales, Stanford-Binet, Wechsler Intelligence Scale for Children, NNAT-2 Test (Naglieri non-verbal abilities test and Woodcock-Johnson Tests of Achievement, Common Core Testing. Here is a complete listing of the tests covered according to their website:

References

External links
Official site
 Testing Mom Featured in Huffington Post

Internet properties established in 2010
American educational websites
Student assessment and evaluation